A kill is a body of water, most commonly a creek, but also a tidal inlet, river, strait, or arm of the sea. The term is derived from the Middle Dutch kille (kil in modern Dutch), meaning "riverbed" or "water channel". It is found in areas of Dutch influence in the Netherlands' former North American colony of New Netherland, primarily the Hudson and Delaware Valleys.

Examples of the freestanding use of "kill" are:
Anthony Kill, in Saratoga County, New York which flows from Round Lake through the city of Mechanicville into the Hudson River.
Arthur Kill and Kill Van Kull, both separating Staten Island, New York from New Jersey
Batten Kill, Vermont and New York
Bronx Kill between the Bronx and Randalls Island
Fresh Kills, New York
Normans Kill, an upper Hudson River tributary near Albany, New York
Poesten Kill, a creek near Troy, New York 
Wynants Kill, another creek near Troy, New York
West Kill, a creek in Greene County, New York
West Kill, New York

"Kill" is also joined with a noun to create a composite name for a place or body of water:
Catskill, New York
Catskill Mountains, New York
Catskill Creek which flows from the Catskill Mountains, New York to the Hudson River.
Cobleskill, New York
Cresskill, New Jersey
Fishkill, New York
Kaaterskill Clove, a deep gorge, or valley, in New York's eastern Catskill Mountains
Kaaterskill Creek, a tributary of Catskill Creek
Kaaterskill Falls
Kaaterskill High Peak, one of the Catskill Mountains
Peekskill, New York
Poestenkill, New York
Schuylkill River, Pennsylvania
Raymondskill Falls, Pennsylvania
Wallkill, New York
Wynantskill, New York

The single 'l' spelling of 'kil' is the norm in modern Dutch geographical names, e.g. Dordtsche Kil, Sluiskil, or Kil van Hurwenen.  It can occasionally be found in North America.

References

Bodies of water